John Hedon (fl. 1378–1386), of Kingston upon Hull, Yorkshire, was an English politician.

He was a Member (MP) of the Parliament of England for Kingston upon Hull in 1378 and 1386.

See also
Politics of England

References

Year of birth missing
Year of death missing
English MPs 1378
Politicians from Kingston upon Hull
English MPs 1386